Kangmar County is a county of Xigazê in the Tibet Autonomous Region, bordering India's Sikkim state to the south. Gala Co lake is located in Kangmar County.

Town and townships
 Kangmar Town
 Namnying Township
 Sapügang Township
 Kamru Township
 Zhontreng Township
 Samada Township
 Gala Township
 Nyêrudoi Township
 Nyêrumai Township

Counties of Tibet
Shigatse